Caryospora may refer to

Caryospora (aveolate), a genus of protozoa
Caryospora (fungus), a genus of fungi